The Milwaukee Brewers' 2003 season involved the Brewers' finishing 6th in the National League Central with a record of 68 wins and 94 losses.

Offseason
 October 11, 2002: Scott Podsednik was selected off waivers by the Milwaukee Brewers from the Seattle Mariners.
November 5, 2002: Brooks Kieschnick was signed as a free agent with the Milwaukee Brewers.
November 13, 2002: Scott Seabol was signed as a free agent with the Milwaukee Brewers.
January 31, 2003: John Vander Wal was signed as a free agent with the Milwaukee Brewers.
February 13, 2003: Tim Crabtree was signed as a free agent with the Milwaukee Brewers.

Regular season
On September 19, 2003, Arizona Diamondbacks pitcher Randy Johnson hit a home run off of Brewers pitcher Doug Davis, his only MLB home run.

Season standings

National League Central

Record vs. opponents

Transactions
May 15, 2003: Scott Seabol was released by the Milwaukee Brewers.
June 3, 2003: Tony Gwynn, Jr. was drafted by the Milwaukee Brewers in the 2nd round of the 2003 amateur draft. Player signed June 19, 2003.

Roster

Players stats

Batting

Starters by position 
Note: Pos = Position; G = Games played; AB = At bats; H = Hits; Avg. = Batting average; HR = Home runs; RBI = Runs batted in

Other batters 
Note: G = Games played; AB = At bats; H = Hits; Avg. = Batting average; HR = Home runs; RBI = Runs batted in

Pitching

Starting pitchers 
Note: G = Games pitched; IP = Innings pitched; W = Wins; L = Losses; ERA = Earned run average; SO = Strikeouts

Other pitchers 
Note: G = Games pitched; IP = Innings pitched; W = Wins; L = Losses; ERA = Earned run average; SO = Strikeouts

Relief pitchers 
Note: G = Games pitched; W = Wins; L = Losses; SV = Saves; ERA = Earned run average; SO = Strikeouts

Farm system

The Brewers' farm system consisted of eight minor league affiliates in 2003. The Brewers operated a Venezuelan Summer League team as a co-op with the Cincinnati Reds.

References

2003 Milwaukee Brewers team page at Baseball Reference
2003 Milwaukee Brewers team page at www.baseball-almanac.com

Milwaukee Brewers seasons
Milwaukee Brew
Milwaukee Brewers